Washington, officially the Town of Washington, is a town in Knox County, Maine. The population was 1,590 at the 2020 United States Census.

History
Washington, Maine was first settled in 1797, by the Nelson family.  At that time it was known as Putnam, named after General Israel Putnam, a war hero. It was officially renamed Washington in 1825. One early item of interest in Washington's history was the "paint mine". There was a large deposit of red and yellow ocher in a nearby cave, which may have been used by people who lived here three to five thousand years ago and who used large quantities of ocher, normally red, to cover both the bodies of the dead and the burial artifacts. Archaeologists refer to these people as "Red Paint People". The red panel at the hoist of the Official Town Flag refers to these people.

Geography

Demographics

2010 census
As of the census of 2010, there were 1,527 people, 614 households, and 427 families living in the town. The ethnic makeup of the town was 96.9% White, 0.4% African American, 0.6% Native American, 0.1% Asian, 0.1% from other races, and 1.9% from two or more races. Hispanic or Latino of any race were 0.4% of the population.

There were 614 households, of which 28.5% had children under the age of 18 living with them, 56.0% were married couples living together, 7.0% had a female householder with no husband present, 6.5% had a male householder with no wife present, and 30.5% were non-families. 23.8% of all households were made up of individuals, and 9.1% had someone living alone who was 65 years of age or older. The average household size was 2.43 and the average family size was 2.83.

The median age in the town was 43.9 years. 20.4% of residents were under the age of 18; 6.5% were between the ages of 18 and 24; 24.3% were from 25 to 44; 33.3% were from 45 to 64; and 15.5% were 65 years of age or older. The gender makeup of the town was 51.9% male and 48.1% female.

2000 census
As of the census of 2000, there were 1,345 people, 518 households, and 361 families living in the town. There were 694 housing units at an average density of 18.3 per square mile (7.1/km). The ethnic makeup of the town was 98.81% White, 0.07% Native American, 0.07% from other races, and 1.04% from two or more races. Hispanic or Latino of any race were 0.37% of the population.

There were 518 households, out of which 32.0% had children under the age of 18 living with them, 57.7% were married couples living together, 8.3% had a female householder with no husband present, and 30.3% were non-families. 22.2% of all households were made up of individuals, and 6.9% had someone living alone who was 65 years of age or older.  The average household size was 2.54 and the average family size was 2.96.

In the town, the population was spread out, with 23.8% under the age of 18, 6.5% from 18 to 24, 29.3% from 25 to 44, 29.5% from 45 to 64, and 10.9% who were 65 years of age or older.  The median age was 40 years. For every 100 females, there were 104.4 males.  For every 100 females age 18 and over, there were 102.2 males.

The median income for a household in the town was $35,492, and the median income for a family was $40,486. Males had a median income of $29,375 versus $21,136 for females. The per capita income for the town was $15,488.  About 8.8% of families and 13.4% of the population were below the poverty line, including 16.2% of those under age 18 and 9.0% of those age 65 or over.

Education 
Regional School Unit 40 operates public schools. Prescott Memorial School is in Washington.

Medomak Valley Middle School and Medomak Valley High School are in nearby Waldoboro.

Gibbs Library is in Washington.

Notable people 

 Alonzo Bowman, Medal of Honor recipient
 Elmer McCurdy, an outlaw born in the town on Thursday, January 1, 1880 whose body was displayed many times between 1911, when he died in a shootout with police officers, up until 1976
 Clyde Sukeforth, Major League Baseball catcher, coach, scout, and manager, was born in Washington

References

External links
 
 Downtown Gallery
 Maine Genealogy: Washington, Knox County, Maine
 Gibbs Library

Towns in Knox County, Maine
Towns in Maine